The white-headed hagfish (Myxine ios) is a species of jawless fish of the family Myxinidae (hagfish).

Its scientific name alludes to the Institute of Oceanographic Sciences (IOS), Wormley, Surrey, which supplied the holotype.

Distribution
It is non-migratory, living in the North Atlantic waters off Iceland, Ireland and the western Sahara.

Description
It is a seven-gilled hagfish; it can be distinguished from related species by its large number of tooth cusps: between 44 and 51. The Irish M. ios population is distinguished from the southern variety by its white head and whitish middorsal or midventral line.

Behaviour
M. ios is a scavenger of dead or disabled fish, which it bores into. Its eggs are large, .

References
 

Myxinidae
Fish of the North Atlantic
Fish described in 1981
Taxa named by Bo Fernholm